Jasionna  is a village in the administrative district of Gmina Białobrzegi, within Białobrzegi County, Masovian Voivodeship, in east-central Poland.

The village has a population of 130.

References

Jasionna
Masovian Voivodeship (1526–1795)
Radom Governorate
Kielce Voivodeship (1919–1939)